Lee Steere (21 June 1803 – 1890) was a British Conservative Party politician.

Heath was co-elected MP for West Surrey at a by-election in 1870; he held one of the two seats serving that area until 1880 when he did not stand for re-election.

During his life, Steere was also a Justice of the Peace, Deputy Lieutenant of Surrey and High Sheriff of Surrey.

Steere married Anne Watson, daughter of J K Watson, in 1826 and together they had five sons, one of whom was Australian politician James George Lee Steere.

He died on 9 October 1890 at his main home Jayes (Jayes Park) in the parish of Wotton, his probate was sworn that year with personal, vested assets of  expressly in Britain which denotes he had foreign assets.

References

External links
 

Conservative Party (UK) MPs for English constituencies
UK MPs 1874–1880
1803 births
1890 deaths
Deputy Lieutenants of Surrey
High Sheriffs of Surrey